is a Shinto shrine in Nagata-ku, Kobe, Japan. At Nagata, Kotoshironushi-no-Okami is enshrined.

The shrine is associated with Amaterasu, who is said to have told Empress Jingū that a shrine was wanted at Nagata.

History
According to the Nihon Shoki, Nagata was founded by Empress Jingū at the beginning of the 3rd century along with Hirota Shrine. In 2001, the shrine celebrated its 1,800 years of history.

Nagata is related to Sumiyoshi Taisha and Ikuta Shrine.

Festivals and events 
An autumn matsuri in October is a special day (en'nichi) for the kami Kotoshironushi.

A setsubun observance in February is the Tsuina-shiki Shinji, which engages hopes for safety in the home and averting misfortune. This Shinto purification ritual is designated as an intangible cultural heritage event. The elaborate ceremony is a pantomime representation of driving out demons or bad spirits.

See also
 List of Shinto shrines
 Twenty-Two Shrines
 Modern system of ranked Shinto Shrines
 Nagata Maru

Notes

References

 Ponsonby-Fane, Richard.  (1964). Visiting Famous Shrines in Japan. Kyoto: Ponsonby-Fane Memorial Society.

External links

  Nagata jinja official website 

3rd-century establishments in Japan
Buildings and structures in Kobe
Shinto shrines in Hyōgo Prefecture
Tourist attractions in Kobe
Beppyo shrines